Moshe Shapiro (October 1944 – 3 December 2013) was a chemist and physicist at the University of British Columbia.

Research
Shapiro's research focused on coherent control, laser catalysis, quantum computing, transition state spectroscopy, quantum mechanics, and other areas.

Awards and achievements
Shapiro published more than 300 papers, and the book Principles of the Quantum Control of Molecular Processes with P. Brumer. He won a variety of prizes for his research.

He was the Canada Research Chair Professor in Quantum Control. From 1993 to 2002, he was the Jacques Mimran Professor of Chemical Physics at the Weizmann Institute of Science, Israel.

References

External links
 University of British Columbia Chemistry website
 University of British Columbia Physics website
 Obituary for Moshe Shapiro, J. Phys. B: At. Mol. Opt. Phys. 47 070402

Academic staff of the University of British Columbia
Canadian chemists
Canadian physicists
Israeli physicists
Israeli chemists
Canada Research Chairs
Fellows of the American Physical Society
Place of birth missing
1944 births
2013 deaths
Jewish physicists